Joel Green may refer to:
 Joel B. Green, American New Testament scholar and theologian
 Joel Green (visual effects artist)